Transition metal oxalate complexes are coordination complexes with oxalate (C2O42−) ligands. Some are useful commercially, but the topic has attracted regular scholarly scrutiny. Oxalate (C2O42-) is a kind of dicarboxylate ligand.  As a small, symmetrical dinegative ion, oxalate commonly forms five-membered MO2C2 chelate rings. Mixed ligand complexes are known, e.g., [Co(C2O4)(NH3)4]κ+.

Homoleptic complexes
Homoleptic oxalato complexes are common, e.g., those with the formula [M(κ2-C2O4)3]n-: M = V(III), Mn(III), Cr(III), Tc(IV), Fe(III), Ru(III), Co(III), Rh(III), Ir(III). These anions are chiral (D3 symmetry), and some have been resolved into their component enantiomers.  Some early metals form tetrakis complexes of the type [M(κ2-C2O4)4]n- M = Nb(V), Zr(IV), Hf(IV), Ta(V),

Bimetallic complexes
Oxalate is often a bridging ligand forming bi- and polynuclear complexes with (κ2,κ'2-C2O4)M2 cores. Illustrative binuclear complexes are [M2(C2O4)5]2- M = Fe(II) and Cr(III)

Photochemistry

Metal oxalate complexes are photoactive, degrading with loss of carbon dioxide. This reaction is the basis of the technique called actinometry. UV-irradiation of Pt(C2O4)(PPh3)2 gives derivatives of Pt0(PPh3)2.

See also
Oxalatonickelate

References

Ligands
Oxalato complexes